Edirne, formerly known as Adrianople or Hadrianopolis (Greek: Άδριανούπολις, Bulgarian: Одрин), is a city in Turkey, in the northwestern part of the province of Edirne in Eastern Thrace.

The city is a commercial centre for woven textiles, silks, carpets and agricultural products and has a growing tourism industry. In 2019 its estimated population was 185,408.

Edirne has an attractive location on the rivers Meriç and Tunca and has managed to withstand some of the unattractive development that mars the outskirts of many Turkish cities. 

The town is famous in Turkey for its liver. Ciğer tava (breaded and deep-fried liver) is often served with a side of cacık, a dish of diluted strained yogurt with chopped cucumber.

Names and etymology

The city was founded and named after the Roman emperor Hadrian as Hadrianopolis ( in English, ;  in Greek) on the site of an earlier Thracian settlement named Uskudama. The Ottoman name Edrine (ادرنه) is derived from the Greek name. The name Adrianople was used in English until the Turkish adoption of the Latin alphabet in 1928, after which Edirne became the internationally recognised name. 

History

The area around Edirne has been the site of numerous major battles and sieges starting from the days of the Roman Empire. The vagaries of the border region between Asia and Europe gave rise to Edirne's claim to be the most frequently contested spot on earth.

Antiquity

The city was refounded by the Roman Emperor Hadrian on the site of a previous Thracian settlement known as Uskadama, Uskudama, Uskodama or Uscudama. Hadrian developed it, adorned it with monuments, and changed its name to Hadrianopolis (which would later be pronounced Adrianopolis and Anglicised as Adrianople). Licinius was defeated here by Constantine I in 324, and Emperor Valens was killed by the Goths here during the Battle of Adrianople in 378.

Medieval and early Ottoman periods

In 813, the city was temporarily seized by Khan Krum of Bulgaria who moved its inhabitants to the Bulgarian lands north of the Danube.

During the period of the Latin Empire of Constantinople, the Crusaders were defeated by the Bulgarian Emperor Kaloyan at the Battle of Adrianople in 1205. In 1206 the Latin regime gave Adrianople and the surrounding area to the Byzantine aristocrat Theodore Branas as a hereditary fief. Theodore Komnenos, Despot of Epirus, took possession of it in 1227, but three years later was defeated at Klokotnitsa by Emperor Ivan Asen II of Bulgaria.

In 1362, the Ottomans under Sultan Murad I invaded Thrace and Murad captured Adrianople, probably in 1369 (the date is disputed). The city became "Edirne" in Turkish, reflecting the Turkish pronunciation and Murad moved the Ottoman capital here from Bursa. Mehmed the Conqueror (Sultan Mehmed II) was born in Adrianople, where he came under the influence of Hurufis dismissed by Taşköprüzade in the Şakaiki Numaniye as 'certain accursed ones of no significance', who were burnt as heretics by Mahmud Pasha.

The city remained the seat of Ottoman power until 1453, when Mehmed II took Constantinople (present-day Istanbul) and moved the capital there. The importance of Edirne to the early Ottomans explains the plethora of early Ottoman mosques, medreses and other monuments that have survived until today although the Eski Sarayı (Old Palace) was largely destroyed, leaving only relatively slight remains. Also, there is evidence of a scriptorium in the Ottoman's Edirne palace during this period.

Later Ottoman period
That Adrianople/Edirne continued to hold an important place in Ottoman hearts is reflected in the fact that Sultan Mehmed IV left the Topkapı Palace in Constantinople to die here in 1693.
The wife of the British ambassador to the Ottoman Empire, Lady Mary Wortley Montagu, spent six weeks in Edirne (then Adrianople) in the spring of 1717 and left an account of her experiences there in her The Turkish Embassy Letters. Wearing Turkish dress, Montagu witnessed the passage of Sultan Ahmed III to the mosque, visited the young wife-to-be of his vizier, Damad Ibrahim Pasha and was shown around the Selimiye Mosque. 

Adrianople was briefly occupied by imperial Russian troops in 1829 during the Greek War of Independence and in 1878 during the Russo-Turkish War of 1877–1878. The city suffered a fire in 1905. At that time it had about 80,000 inhabitants, of whom 30,000 were Turks; 22,000 Greeks; 10,000 Bulgarians; 4,000 Armenians; 12,000 Jews; and 2,000 more citizens of unclassified ethnic/religious backgrounds.

Adrianople was a vital fortress defending Constantinople and Eastern Thrace during the Balkan Wars of 1912–13. It was briefly occupied by the Bulgarians in 1913, following the Siege of Adrianople. The Great Powers – Britain, Italy, France and Russia – attempted to coerce the Ottoman Empire into ceding Adrianople to Bulgaria during the temporary winter truce of the First Balkan War. The belief that the government was willing to give up the city created a scandal for the Ottoman government in Constantinople (as Adrianople was a former capital of the Empire), leading to the 1913 Ottoman coup d'état led by the Committee of Union and Progress (CUP) under Enver Pasha. Although it was victorious in the coup,  the CUP was unable to stop the Bulgarians from capturing the city after fighting resumed in the spring. Despite relentless pressure from the Great Powers, the Ottoman empire never officially ceded the city to Bulgaria. 

Edirne was swiftly reconquered by the Ottomans during the Second Balkan War under the leadership of Enver Pasha (who proclaimed himself the "second conqueror of Adrianople" after Murad I) following the collapse of the Bulgarian army in the region.

The entire Armenian population of the city was deported to Syria and Mesopotamia during the Armenian genocide on 27–28 October 1915 and 17–18 February 1916. Their property and businesses were sold at low prices to Turkish Muslims.

During the Greek War of Independence, the Russo-Turkish War (1877–1878) and the Balkan Wars (1912-1913), Balkan-Muslims fled to Edirne and became known as Muhacir.

Administrative arrangements 
Adrianople was a sanjak centre during the Ottoman period and was bound to, successively, the Rumeli Eyalet and Silistre Eyalet before becoming a provincial capital of the Eyalet of Edirne at the beginning of the 19th century; until 1878, the Eyalet of Adrianople comprised the sanjaks of Edirne, Tekfurdağı, Gelibolu, Filibe, and İslimye. After land reforms in 1867, the Eyalet of Adrianople became the Vilayet of Adrianople.

Turkish Republic
Adrianople/Edirne was ceded to Greece by the Treaty of Sèvres in 1920, but recaptured and annexed by Turkey after the Greek defeat at the end of the Greco-Turkish War, also known as the Western Front of the larger Turkish War of Independence, in 1922. Under the Greek administration, Edirne (officially known as Adrianople) was the capital of the Adrianople Prefecture.

From 1934 onwards Edirne was the seat of the Second Inspectorate General, in which an Inspector General governed the provinces of Edirne, Çanakkale, Tekirdaĝ and Kırklareli. The Inspectorate Generals governmental posts were abandoned in 1948, but the legal framework for them was only abolished in 1952 during the government of the Democrat Party.

Ecclesiastical history

Adrianople was made the seat of a Greek metropolitan and of an Armenian bishop. It is also the centre of a Bulgarian diocese but this is not recognised and has been deprived of a bishop. The city also had some Protestants. The few, mainly foreign Latin Catholics were dependent on the vicariate-apostolic of Constantinople. Adrianople also contained the parish of St. Anthony of Padua (Minors Conventual) and a school for girls conducted by the Sisters of Charity of Agram. The suburb of Karaağaç contained a church (Minor Conventuals), a school for boys (Assumptionists) and a school for girls (Oblates of the Assumption). Each of its mission stations, at Tekirdağ and Alexandroupoli, had a school (Minor Conventuals), and there was one at Gallipoli (the Assumptionists).

Around 1850, from the standpoint of the Eastern Catholic Churches, Adrianople was the residence of a Bulgarian vicar-apostolic for the 4,600 Eastern Catholics of the Ottoman vilayet (province) of Thrace and after 1878 - of the principality of Bulgaria. They had eighteen parishes or missions, six of which were in the principality, with twenty churches or chapels, thirty-one priests, of whom six were Assumptionists and six were Resurrectionists; and eleven schools with 670 pupils. In Adrianople itself there were only a few United Bulgarians, with an Episcopal church of St. Elias, and the churches of St. Demetrius and Sts. Cyril and Methodius. The last is served by the Resurrectionists, who also have a college with ninety pupils. In the suburb of Karaağaç, the Assumptionists have a parish and a seminary with fifty pupils. Besides the Eastern Catholic Bulgarians, the above statistics included the Greek Catholic missions of Malgara (now Malkara) and Daoudili (now Davuteli village in Malkara), with four priests and 200 faithful, because from the civil point of view belonged to the Bulgarian Vicariate.

Later however, the Roman Catholic diocese was discontinued, and exists only in name as a titular metropolitan archbishopric, under the full name Hadrianopolis in Haemimonto to distinguish it from several other titular sees named Hadrianopolis.

In 2018, archaeologists discovered remains of a Byzantine church. The church was built around 500 AD and it was an early Byzantine period building.

Geography

Climate
Edirne has a borderline humid subtropical (Cfa) and hot-summer Mediterranean climate  (Csa) in the Köppen climate classification, and a temperate oceanic climate (Do) in the Trewartha climate classification. Edirne has hot, moderately dry summers and chilly, wet and often snowy winters.

Attractions

Edirne is famed for its many mosques, medreses and other Ottoman monuments.

Mosques 
The Selimiye Mosque, built in 1575 and designed by Turkey's greatest architect, Mimar Sinan (c. 1489/1490–1588), is the most important monument in the city and became a UNESCO world heritage site in 2011. Sinan himself believed the dome to be higher than that of Hagia Sophia, the former Byzantine Orthodox Cathedral in Istanbul, but modern measuring methods seem to suggest otherwise. Named after Sultan Selim II (r. 1566–1574) who commissioned it but did not live to see its completion, the mosque is decorated with Turkish marble and magnificent İznik tiles. It is the centre of a considerable complex of contemporary buildings.

Work started on the Eski Cami (Old Mosque) in1403 but was not completed until 1422. It was designed is what is usually thought of as the Bursa style. Even finer is the Üç Şerefli Mosque (Three-Balconied Mosque) which was built between 1437 and 1447 for Sultan Murad II. It was the largest mosque built in the Ottoman provinces before the conquest of Constantinople. Both these mosques are in the centre of Edirne.

Further away from the centre, the complex of Sultan Beyazid II, built between 184 and 1488, and has a lovely semi-rural location. It is the most complete surviving mosque complex in Edirne, consisting of an imaret (soup kitchen), darüşşifa (hospital), timarhane (asylum), hospice, tıp medrese (medical school), tabhane (accommodation for dervishes) bakery and assorted depots. Some parts of the complex now house a museum to the history of Islamic medicine.

Edirne Palace 
Edirne Palace ( for "New Imperial Palace") in the Sarayiçi quarter, was built in the reign of Murad II (r. 1421–1444) but was destroyed in 1877, during  the Russo-Turkish War. The palace gate and kitchen have since been restored. The Kasr-ı Adalet ("Justice Castle"), originally built as part of the palace complex, stands intact next to the small Fatih Bridge over the Tunca river.The splendid appearance of the palace in the late 1460s when it glistened with gold, silver and marble was described by Kritovoulos of İmbros in his History of Mehmed the Conqueror.

Other religious monuments 
Dating back to 1909, the Grand Synagogue of Edirne was restored and re-opened in March 2015. A Roman Catholic and two Bulgarian Orthodox churches are also to be found in the city.

Other historic monuments 
Edirne has three historic covered bazaars: the Kavaflar Arastası (Cobblers Arcade), next to the Selimiye Mosque and constructed to bring in an income to support the külliye; the Bedesten next to the Eski Cami which was supported by the income from the shops; and the Semiz Ali Paşa Çarşısı (Ali Pasha Bazaar, AKA Kapalı Çarşı), another work of Sinan dating back to 1568. The Kavaflar Arastası is the place to come to buy miniature versions of the handmade brooms with mirrors set into them that used to play a part in marriage ceremonies as well as to buy soap in the shape of fruits. 

Of the original Roman Hadrianopolis only slight remains of the fortifications survive near the so-called Macedonian Tower, itself probably a part of the defences although much patched-up and altered over the ensuing centuries.

Edirne Museum (Edirne Müzesi) contains collections of local archaeology and ethnography. In the grounds outside can be seen an example of the sort of dolmen to be seen at nearby Lalapaşa.

In the town centre stand the Rüstem Pasha (1560-61) and Ekmekcioğlu Ahmed Pasha caravanserais, designed to accommodate travellers - in the case of the Rüstem Pasha by Mimar Sinan - in the 16th century. The Rüstem Pasha Caravanerai now serves as the Kervansaray Hotel.

The Balkan Wars Memorial Cemetery is located close to the ruins of the Edirne Palace, with an Unknown Soldier monument featuring an Ottoman soldier in front of its entrance.

The Meriç and Tunca rivers, which flow around west and south of the city, are crossed by elegant arched bridges dating back to early Ottoman times. 

The historic Karaağaç railway station has been restored to house Trakya University's Faculty of Fine Arts. The Treaty of Lausanne Monument and Museum are in the surrounding park.

Festivals

The Kırkpınar oil-wrestling tournament is held every year in late June or early July. 

Kakava, an international festival celebrated by the Romani people in Turkey is held on 5-6 May each year.

Bocuk Gecesi is a festival of Balkan origin celebrated in mid-January on what is expected to be the coldest day of the year. It is a sort of Turish take on Halloween.

Economy 

Edirne's economy largely depends on agriculture. 73% of the working population work in agriculture, fishing, forests and hunting. The lowlands are productive. Corn, sugarbeets and sunflowers are the leading crops. Melons, watermelons, rice, tomatoes, eggplants and viniculture are important.

The through highway that connects Europe to Istanbul, Anatolia and the Middle East passes through Edirne.

Industry is developing. Agriculture-based industries (agro-industries) are especially important for the city's economy.

Education

Universities
 Trakya University, which is linked with Lörrach University through the Erasmus programme of the EU.

High schools
 Beykent Educational Institutions
 80th Year of Republic Anatolian High School (80. Yıl Cumhuriyet Anadolu Lisesi in Turkish)
 Edirne Anatolian Teacher Training High School (Edirne Anadolu Öğretmen Lisesi in Turkish: It has been transformed into Edirne Social Sciences High School)
 Edirne Anatolian Technical High School (Edirne Anadolu Teknik Lisesi in Turkish)
 Edirne Beykent High School of Science (Özel Edirne Beykent Fen Lisesi)
 Edirne Beykent High School of Anatolian (Özel Edirne Beykent Anadolu Lisesi)
 Edirne High School (Anatolian High School) (Edirne Lisesi in Turkish)
 Edirne Ilhami Ertem High School (Edirne İlhami Ertem Lİsesi in Turkish)
 Edirne Industrial Vocational High School (Edirne Endüstri Meslek Lisesi in Turkish)
 Edirne Milli Piyango Trade Profession High School (Edirne Milli Piyango Ticaret Meslek Lisesi)
 Edirne Suleyman Demirel Science & Maths High School (Edirne Fen Lisesi in Turkish)
 Edirne Yildirim Anatolian High School (Edirne Anadolu Lisesi - Yıldırım Anadolu Lisesi in Turkish)
 Edirne Fine Arts High School (Edirne Güzel Sanatlar Lisesi in Turkish)

Gallery

Quarters

Twin cities

Notable people

Sultans
 Bayezid I (1360—1403), Ottoman sultan from 1389 to 1402
 Mahmud I (1696—1754), Ottoman sultan from 1730 to 1754
 Mehmed the Conqueror (1432–1481), Ottoman sultan who conquered Constantinople (today Istanbul)
 Mustafa II (1664–1703), Ottoman sultan from 1695 to 1703
 Osman III (1699—1757), Ottoman sultan from 1754 to 1757
 Şahin Giray (1745-1787), last khan of Crimea

Historical
 Caleb Afendopolo (before 1430-1499), Jewish polyhistor
 Athanasius I of Constantinople (1230—1310), Ecumenical Patriarch of Constantinople
 Athanasius V of Jerusalem (died 1844), Greek Orthodox Patriarch of Jerusalem
 Hagop Baronian (1843—1891), Ottoman Armenian writer, satirist, educator
 Elijah Bashyazi (c. 1420—1490), Karaite Jewish hakham
 Theodore Branas, Byzantine general
 Nikephoros Bryennios (ethnarch), Byzantine general
 Abraham ben Raphael Caro, 18th-century Ottoman rabbi
 Karpos Papadopoulos (1790s-1871), Member of the Filiki Eteria
 Theoklitos Polyeidis (1698-1759), Greek scholar, teacher, translator, priest and monk
 Dionysius V of Constantinople (1820-1891), Ecumenical Patriarch of Constantinople
 Joseph Halévy (1827—1917), Ottoman-born Jewish-French Orientalist and traveler
 Abdulcelil Levni (died 1732), Ottoman court painter and miniaturist
 Neşâtî (?–1674), Ottoman poet
 Georgi Valkovich (1833—1892), Bulgarian physician, diplomat and politician
 Yirmisekiz Mehmed Çelebi (died 1732), Ottoman statesman and ambassador
 Stefanos Koumanoudis (1818-1899), Greek archaeologist, university teacher, writer and translator
 Charles XII, Swedish king who stayed in the city for most of 1713during his exile in the Ottoman Empire
 Baháʼu'lláh, founder of the Baháʼí faith, lived in Edirne from 1863 to 1868. He was exiled here by the Ottoman Empire before being banished to the Ottoman penal colony in Akka. Referred to Adrianople in his writings as the "Land of Mystery".

Contemporary
 Cem Adrian (born 1980), Turkish singer-songwriter, author, producer and film director
 Şevket Süreyya Aydemir (1897—1976), Turkish writer, intellectual, economist, historian
 Atılay Canel (born 1955), Turkish football coach
 Cavit Erdel (1884—1933), Ottoman Army officer and Turkish Army general
 Hüsrev Gerede (1884-1962), Ottoman and Turkish Army officer, politician and diplomat
 Avra Theodoropoulou (1880-1863), Greek musician and activist 
 Ragıp Gümüşpala (1897-1964), 11th Chief of the General Staff of the Turkish Armed Forces
 Acun Ilıcalı (born 1969), Turkish television personality and producer
 Haşim İşcan (1898-1968), Turkish high school teacher, province governor and the first elected mayor of Istanbul
 Kemal Kerinçsiz (born 1960), Turkish ultra-nationalist lawyer
 Özlem Kolat (born 1984), Turkish classical clarinet player
 Michael Petkov (1850-1921), Bulgarian Eastern Catholic priest
 Muharrem Korhan Yamaç (born 1972), Paralympics, world and European champion disabled sport shooter
 Nikos Zachariadis (1903—1973), General Secretary of the Communist Party of Greece
 Gökberk Ergeneman (born 1995) National Tennis Player

See also
 List of battles of Adrianople
 List of treaties of Adrianople
 Trakya University

References
https://www.academia.edu/23674853/Edirne_Ta%C5%9F_K%C3%B6pr%C3%BCleri_Edirne_Stone_Bridges

Further reading

External links

 Edirne Directory
 GCatholic.org
 Edirne Weather Forecast Information
 Photographs of the town and monuments taken by Disk Osseman
 Awarded "EDEN - European Destinations of Excellence" non-traditional tourist destination 2008

 
Hadrianopolis in Haemimonto
Cities in Turkey
Former national capitals
Jewish communities in Turkey
Populated places established in the 2nd century
Roman sites in Turkey